Pouteria pubescens is a species of plant in the genus Pouteria within the family Sapotaceae. It is found in Brazil and Peru. Its conservation status is vulnerable. The fruit of this plant are edible and are known as eggfruits. It is a hardwood neotropical plant.

References

pubescens
Vulnerable plants
Taxonomy articles created by Polbot
Taxa named by André Aubréville
Taxa named by François Pellegrin